Chinantla Municipality is a municipality in Puebla in south-eastern Mexico.

According to INEGI figures the municipality had a 2005 population of some 2,264 inhabitants.

References

Municipalities of Puebla